Smokie (originally spelt Smokey) are an English rock band from Bradford, Yorkshire. The band found success at home and abroad after teaming up with Mike Chapman and Nicky Chinn. They have had a number of line-up changes and were still actively touring in 2023. Their most popular hit single, "Living Next Door to Alice", peaked at No. 3 on the UK Singles Chart and, in March 1977, reached No. 25 on the Billboard Hot 100, as well as going to No. 1 on the Australian singles chart. Other hit singles include "If You Think You Know How to Love Me", "Oh Carol", "Lay Back in the Arms of Someone", and "I'll Meet You at Midnight".

History

Early years

The band was formed as "The Yen" after a chance meeting between Ron Kelly and Alan Silson in Moore's Music Shop, North Parade, Bradford, in October 1963. Two days after that meeting they were joined by Chris Norman for rehearsals, but without finding a suitable bass player, just practiced together for a year. The addition of Terry Uttley on bass guitar at the beginning of 1965 completed the line-up and The Yen's first gig was at Birkenshaw School in February 1965. It was composed of Chris Norman (lead vocals/rhythm guitar), Terry Uttley (bass/vocals), Alan Silson (lead guitar/vocals), and Ron Kelly (drums). They were renamed "The Sphynx", and later "Essence". As Essence, they toured small clubs in Bradford and the surrounding communities before they split in 1966. The Black Cats were already a working band when Ron Kelly joined them at Dewsbury College in September 1966. The Black Cats at this time were Peter Eastwood on guitar/vocals and Arthur Higgins on bass. Kelly replaced the drummer they had at the time. Alan Silson and Pete Eastwood joined the band, but the latter soon left and was replaced by Chris Norman. In November 1967 the band changed their name to "The Four Corners".

In April 1968, the group found a manager in Mark Jordan, who advised them to rename themselves "The Elizabethans". The group now became fully professional, and the members garnered higher salaries. In June 1968, Terry Uttley joined the group as a replacement for Arthur Higgins, who had left the band in order to carry on his education. On 9 December 1968 the group had their first TV appearance on Yorkshire Television's news and magazine show Calendar. In August 1969, the four performed two songs for the BBC show High Jinx. Enthused with this successful performance, Jordan had them record their first demo tape. In January 1970, RCA Records showed an interest in the band and suggested a name change to "Kindness". The double A-side "Light of Love"/"Lindy Lou" was released on 3 April 1970.

An arrangement was made with Ronnie Storm (no connection to Rory Storm) to back him on the single release "My Desire", and it was released under the pseudonym "Fuzzy and The Barnets" due to contractual difficulties encountered by Storm. At the same time Steve Rowland, of Family Dogg, heard the band playing live on Radio One Club and offered to sign them to his production company. He arranged for Albert Hammond, who was also in Family Dogg, to write a number for the band, entitled "It Never Rains in Southern California". However, before it could be released, Hammond decided to record it himself, for which Kelly was recruited by Steve Rowland to play drums. Hammond wrote other songs for the band, and a single "You Ring a Bell"/"Have You Met Angela" was recorded, but due to various problems in Rowland's organisation, it was not released. In late 1971 the band's management was taken over by Dave Eager, the BBC Radio One DJ, at the same time that Norman suffered a serious infection that affected his vocal cords. After his recovery, his voice sounded much rougher, which the other group members considered an interesting addition to their sound. Eager introduced them to Decca, which resulted in recordings in February 1972, their first single being "Oh Julie"/"I Love You Carolina". Shortly thereafter, their next single was released. "Let the Good Times Roll" was liked by the media and was selected as the opening theme for Emperor Rosko's BBC Radio One Saturday show, but this popularity did not translate into record sales. The last Decca single was "Make it Better"/"Lonely Long Lady", which flopped, and their Decca contract was cancelled.

Rise to fame

During the band's Decca contract, Eager used his contacts with the Manchester-based agency Kennedy Street Enterprises, to gain the band an audition to be Peter Noone's backing band. The band were  asked to become his permanent band after their audition at Noone's House in Denham, Buckinghamshire, and soon they embarked on a nationwide tour with him. Noone did not bring the boys any luck, but during the tour Bill Hurley offered to manage them. Hurley convinced Eager to release the boys from the contract with him. Ron Kelly left Kindness on 8 August 1973 and the band recruited an old school friend, Pete Spencer (drums/vocals), who had played in various groups, to drum for them. This line-up performed on a sightseeing boat in Frankfurt, Germany. Hurley introduced the band to composers Nicky Chinn and Mike Chapman, who also wrote songs for glam rock contemporaries Sweet, Mud, and Suzi Quatro. At first "Chinnichap" turned them down, but Hurley's tenacity eventually convinced the composers/producers to give the young group a chance. Hurley and Chinnichap started working with the band, and suggested yet another name change, to "Smokey". An attempt to dress the band up in leather clothes (similar to Suzi Quatro) was dropped, and the four won acceptance for their jeans outfit.

They purchased new instruments and in late 1974 began recording their debut album Pass It Around which was released 14 February 1975. The album spawned the title track as a single but failed to gain significant attention. In April Smokey opened for Pilot on tour.

Height of popularity
On 22 September 1975, Smokie released their second album, Changing All the Time. The first single from the new album, "If You Think You Know How to Love Me", became a hit in many European countries, peaking at No. 3 in the UK Singles Chart.  They followed it with "Don't Play Your Rock 'n' Roll to Me".

Around this time, Smokey Robinson threatened to file a lawsuit, alleging that the band's name would confuse the audience. In order to avoid legal action, the group changed the spelling to "Smokie". They began their first tour as headline act, after the release of their second album.

The third LP was partly produced in the US, where Nicky Chinn had relocated. Called Midnight Café, it built on the popularity of Changing All the Time. The subsequent years yielded a string of successful singles: "Something's Been Making Me Blue", "Wild Wild Angels", and "I'll Meet You At Midnight". Their cover of Australian band New World's single, "Living Next Door to Alice", released in November 1976, reached No. 5 on the UK Singles Chart, followed by another hit "Lay Back in the Arms of Someone". Smokie now found themselves European superstars, with sold-out tours and million-selling albums. The next two albums, 1977's Bright Lights & Back Alleys and The Montreux Album (1978), cemented their status and were both chart successes. From Bright Lights & Back Alleys came two hit singles, the reggae influenced "It's Your Life" and a cover of "Needles and Pins".

At the peak of Smokie's success in 1978, Chris Norman teamed up with Suzi Quatro and released a duet single, "Stumblin' In" — another Chinnichap composition. Norman and Quatro were on top of the European charts for some time, and it reached the US Top 10, though only No. 41 in the UK. Smokie's subsequent 45 was "Mexican Girl". Composed by Norman and Spencer, the record saw the group actively distance itself from Chinnichap. Chris Norman and Pete Spencer wrote and produced the British football star Kevin Keegan's first single, "Head Over Heels in Love", a No. 31 UK hit.

In 1979, the album The Other Side of the Road was released, entirely recorded in Australia. It spawned two more singles for the band, "Do to Me" and "Babe It's Up to You", but it became clear that their sales were declining.

Smokie took a hiatus before Solid Ground was released in 1981. The advance single was a cover of Del Shannon's 1963 hit, "Little Town Flirt" — but it failed to reach the UK Singles Chart.

Chris Norman and Pete Spencer wrote the song "This Time (We'll Get It Right)" which, recorded by 1982's England's World Cup Squad became a No. 2 hit in the UK Singles Chart.

Decline and Norman's departure
In early 1982, the last album for EMI/BMG was released, Strangers in Paradise. The departure from Chinnichap became notable, and the four members of Smokie appeared unable to recreate their success using their own material. Shortly after the release of Strangers In Paradise, work began on two parallel albums, one released by Smokie as Midnight Delight, and the other Chris Norman's solo debut, Rock Away Your Teardrops. Neither release sold well.

In 1983, band members Alan Silson, Chris Norman and Terry Uttley collaborated with Agnetha Fältskog, singing together on the track "Once Burned Twice Shy" from her first English language solo album entitled Wrap Your Arms Around Me. The band say it was on the flight to record this song in Sweden that they decided to part ways. Chris Norman began his solo career and Terry Uttley went on to play bass for several other groups including Peter Goalby and John Coghlan (ex Status Quo drummer). The band said "It just seemed like the right thing to do at the time."

Though Smokie had begun work on a comeback, in 1986, Norman, by that stage enthused with the relative success of his second solo album, Some Hearts Are Diamonds, announced that he was to leave the band. He was replaced by Alan Barton, formerly of Black Lace, who had been suggested by Chris as a good replacement for the band because of his similar vocal style to Norman's. Smokie also recruited keyboard player Martin Bullard. Spencer quit and was replaced on drums by Steve Pinnell. The new line-up released  All Fired Up in 1988, which brought some attention and contained a new version of "Rock Away Your Tear Drops", the song that had been the title track to Norman's debut album.

Comeback
Several releases followed over the next years including Boulevard of Broken Dreams (1989, seven weeks at No. 1 in Norway; all tracks were produced by Simon Humphrey, except "Young Love", which was produced by Dieter Bohlen); Whose Are These Boots? (1990, No. 1 in Norway); Chasing Shadows (1992); and Celebration (1994), which contained old hits in new arrangements accompanied by an orchestra. None had any real success in the UK. However, Smokie made a surprise return to the UK Singles Chart in 1995, with a duet with the controversial northern comedian Roy Chubby Brown. The re-worked re-release of "Living Next Door To Alice (Who the F**k is Alice)" reached No. 3 in the UK. The band had noticed that, whilst touring in Ireland, whenever they sang the main line "For 24 years/I've been living next door to Alice" the audience would shout "Alice? Who the fuck is Alice?" In addition, a resident DJ in a Dutch café, Gompie, organised a recording, and had a No. 17 UK hit with the title of "Alice (Who the X is Alice) (Living Next Door to Alice)" in the United Kingdom, and in the Netherlands where it reached No. 1.

Shortly after the song was recorded Smokie's tour bus careered off of the road during a hailstorm in Germany. Barton, badly injured, died after five days in intensive care. The rest of the band and Brown agreed to donate their royalties from the song to Barton's first wife.

1990s–present
The remaining members decided to continue with the band and went about finding their third lead singer. Friend of the band Mike Craft was chosen. The band released The World and Elsewhere later that year, followed by Light a Candle — The Christmas Album.

In 1996, Alan Silson terminated his membership, saying he intended to pursue a solo career and to work with other acts as well, joining Mickey Finn's T. Rex, and that he also no longer wanted to be on the road all the time. Mick McConnell, one of the band's road crew and their guitar technician replaced him as the group's new lead guitarist, this formation recording the next album, Wild Horses – The Nashville Album (1998), in Nashville, Tennessee. In February 2001, Smokie released two albums, Uncovered and Uncovered Too, which consist entirely of cover versions, with no original songs.

In 2004, Smokie recorded a studio album, On the Wire, with eleven of the 14 songs written by the band themselves. In 2006, the band released the album From the Heart. Although mainly a compilation, it did contain three new tracks.

In 2010, Smokie gained new chart success with a CD of brand new material, Take a Minute. Released in Denmark in August of that year, it peaked at No. 3 on the Danish Albums Chart. Releases in the remainder of Scandinavia and Germany took place during October, with the single "Sally's Song (The Legacy Goes On)"  —  a continuation of the story of the other character in "Living Next Door to Alice"  — also released.

On 16 April 2021 it was announced that Mike Craft left the band, after 26 years. He was replaced by Pete Lincoln, former member of Andy Scott's Sweet.

Uttley died on 16 December 2021, at the age of 70. At the time of his death, he was the last remaining original member who was still active with the band.

Personnel

Members

Current
 Steve Pinnell – drums (1986–present)
 Martin Bullard – keyboards (1986–present)
 Mick McConnell – lead guitar, vocals (1996–present)
 Pete Lincoln – lead vocals, rhythm guitar, bass (2021–present)

Former members
 Terry Uttley - bass, vocals (1964–1966, 1968–2021; died 2021)
 Arthur Higgins - bass, vocals (1966–1968)
 Alan Silson – lead guitar, vocals (1964–1996)
 Chris Norman – lead vocals, rhythm guitar (1964–1986)
 Pete Spencer – drums (1973–1986)
 Alan Barton – lead vocals, rhythm guitar (1986–1995; died 1995)
 Mike Craft – lead vocals, rhythm guitar (1995–2021)

Line-ups

Discography

Pass It Around (1975)
Changing All the Time (1975)
Midnight Café (1976)
Bright Lights & Back Alleys (1977)
The Montreux Album (1978)
The Other Side of the Road (1979)
Solid Ground (1981)
Strangers in Paradise (1982)
Midnight Delight (1982)
All Fired Up (1988)
Boulevard of Broken Dreams (1989)
Whose Are These Boots? (1990)
Chasing Shadows (1992)
Burnin' Ambition (1993)
The World and Elsewhere (1995)
Light A Candle (1996)
Wild Horses – The Nashville Album (1998)
Uncovered (2000)
Uncovered Too (2001)
On the Wire (2004)
Take a Minute (2010)

References

External links

 Smokie biography at AllMusic
 
 Smokie Discography 1975-1982
 
 Smokie fanclub

British soft rock music groups
English pop rock music groups
English glam rock groups
Musical groups from Bradford
Rak Records artists
RSO Records artists